John William Higham (October 26, 1920 – July 26, 2003) was an American historian, scholar of American culture, historiography and ethnicity.  In the 1950s he was a prominent critic of Consensus history. Historian Dorothy Ross says, "The multi-ethnic environment of his early life in Queens, the wartime optimism, and his immersion in Progressive history, with its fundamental faith in American democracy, gave him a vision of an egalitarian, cosmopolitan, American nationalism in which he never lost faith."

Biography

John William Higham was born in Jamaica, Queens on October 26, 1920. He earned his undergraduate history degree from Johns Hopkins University in 1941 and received a master's degree from Yale University in 1942. In World War II, he served with the historical division of the Army Air Forces in Italy. He married psychologist Eileen Moss Higham in 1948.

After serving as assistant editor of The American Mercury, he earned a doctorate at the University of Wisconsin–Madison in 1949, working with Merle Curti. He taught at the University of California, Los Angeles, Rutgers University, Columbia University and the University of Michigan before returning to Johns Hopkins in 1971.

He is noted for having described anti-Catholicism in the United States as "the most luxuriant, tenacious tradition of paranoiac agitation in American history".

Higham died of a cerebral aneurysm in Baltimore, Maryland on July 26, 2003. He was 82 years old at the time of his death.

Works
Many of these items have been republished. These are the first editions.
  "The rise of American intellectual history." American Historical Review 56.3 (1951): 453–471.  online
 . "Intellectual history and its neighbors." Journal of the History of Ideas (1954): 339–347. online
 Strangers in the Land: Patterns of American Nativism, 1860–1925, (Rutgers UP, 1955; new edition, with new epilogue, 2002).
 "Anti-Semitism in the Gilded Age: A Reinterpretation." Mississippi Valley Historical Review 43.4 (1957): 559–578. online
  "Social Discrimination Against Jews in America, 1830-1930." Publications of the American Jewish Historical Society 47.1 (1957): 1–33.  online
 "Another Look at Nativism." Catholic Historical Review 44.2 (1958): 147–158. online
 "The Cult of the American Consensus: Homogenizing Our History," Commentary (1959) 27#2 pp: 93–100. online
 Editor, The reconstruction of American history (Harper, 1962).
 "Beyond Consensus: The Historian as Moral Critic." American Historical Review (1962): 609–625. in JSTOR
 History: Professional Scholarship in America (1965)
 Writing American History: Essays on Modern Scholarship (Indiana UP, 1970)
 "Hanging together: Divergent unities in American history." Journal of American History (1974): 5–28, Presidential address to the Organization of American Historians.  online
 Send these to me: Jews and other immigrants in urban America (Scribner, 1975).
 Edited with Leonard Krieger, and Felix Gilbert. History (1977)
 Ethnic leadership in America (Johns Hopkins UP, 1979).
  "Current trends in the study of ethnicity in the United States." Journal of American Ethnic History 2.1 (1982): 5–15. online
 "Changing paradigms: The collapse of consensus history." Journal of American History (1989): 460–466. in JSTOR; another copy
 "Multiculturalism and universalism: A history and critique." American Quarterly 45#2 (1993), pp. 195–219 online
 "Instead of a sequel, or how I lost my subject." Reviews in American History 28.2 (2000): 327–339. online
 Hanging Together: Unity and Diversity in American Culture, Yale University Press, 2001. Three decades of his essays.  online

Footnotes

Further reading
 Dinnerstein, Leonard, and David M. Reimers. "John Higham and immigration history." Journal of American Ethnic History 24.1 (2004): 3-25. online
 Marinari, Maddalena. “‘An Acrid Odor of the 1920s Is Again in the Air’: The Strange Career of American Nativism and the Ongoing Relevance of John Higham’s ‘Strangers in the Land.’” Journal of the Gilded Age and Progressive Era 11#2, (2012), pp. 258–62. online

 Raphael, Marc Lee. "A reexamination of a classic work in American Jewish history: John Higham, Stranger in the land." American Jewish History 76 (1986): 107-226. 
 Ross, Dorothy.   John Higham: In Memoriam
 Shapiro, Edward S. "John Higham and American Anti-Semitism." American Jewish History 76.2 (1986): 201-213. online

1920 births
2003 deaths
Historians of the United States
20th-century American historians
American male non-fiction writers
University of Michigan faculty
20th-century American male writers
People from Queens, New York
United States Army Air Forces personnel of World War II
Johns Hopkins University alumni
Yale University alumni
University of Wisconsin–Madison alumni
University of California, Los Angeles faculty
Rutgers University faculty
Columbia University faculty
Johns Hopkins University faculty